Werner Scheff (1888–1947) was a German novelist and screenwriter. He is particularly noted as a prolific writer of sports fiction. Following the Nazi Party's rise to power, he emigrated and died in London in 1947.

Selected filmography
 Die Arche (1919)
 The Man in the Saddle (1925)
 Dagfin (1926)
 The Girl on a Swing (1926)
 The Champion of the World (1927)
 Attorney for the Heart (1927)
 The Prisoners of Shanghai (1927)
 Never Trust a Woman (1930)
 Johnny Steals Europe (1932)
 Ship Without a Harbour (1932)
 Secret Agent (1932)
 The Marathon Runner (1933)
 Jumping Into the Abyss (1933)

References

Bibliography 
 Erik N. Jensen. Body by Weimar: Athletes, Gender, and German Modernity. Oxford University Press, 2010.

External links 
 

Film people from Berlin
1888 births
1947 deaths
German male screenwriters
Emigrants from Nazi Germany to the United Kingdom
20th-century German screenwriters